Palkuriki Somanatha was one of the most noted Telugu language writers of the 12th or 13th century. He was also an accomplished writer in the Kannada and Sanskrit languages and penned several classics in those languages. He was a Lingayat a follower of the 12th century social reformer Basava and his writings were primarily intended to propagate this faith.  He was a well acclaimed Shaiva poet.

Life
Indication that he was not a Shaiva by birth comes from the fact that he mentions the names of his parents in his very first work, Basava Purana, as Visnuramideva  and Sriyadevi, violating a general practice of Shaiva writers who do not mention their real parents but rather consider the god Shiva as the father and his consort Parvati as the mother. However, the scholar Bandaru Tammayya has argued that he was born a Jangama (devotee of the god Shiva). The scholar Seshayya places him in the late 13th to early 14th century and proposes that the writer lived during the reign of Kakatiya king Prataparudra II, whereas the Kannada scholar R. Narasimhacharya dates his writings to the 12th century and claims Somanatha was patronised by Kakatiya king Prataparudra I (1140–1196). His place of birth is uncertain because there is a village by the name Palkuriki in the Warangal district of the Telangana state as well as in the Kannada speaking region (Karnataka).

Writings
Telugu language
Important among his Telugu language writings are the Basava Purana, Panditaradhya charitra, Malamadevipuranamu and Somanatha Stava–in dwipada metre ("couplets"); Anubhavasara, Chennamallu Sisamalu, Vrushadhipa Saataka and Cheturvedasara–in verses; Basavodharana in verses and ragale metre (rhymed couplets in blank verse); and the Basavaragada.

Kannada language
His contributions to Kannada literature are, the Basavaragada, Basavadhyaragada, Sadgururagada, Silasampadane, Sahasragananama, Pancharantna. Several Vachana and ragale poems are also his contributions to Kannada literature. Somanatha's Telugu Basavapurana was the inspiration for Vijayanagara poet Bhimakavi (c. 1369) who wrote a Kannada book by the same name. Somanatha was the protagonist of a 16th-century Kannada purana ("epic religious text") written by the Vijayanagara poet Tontadarya.

Sanskrit language
Important among his Sanskrit language writings are the Somanathabhashya, Rudrabhashya, Vrushabhastaka, Basavodharana, Basavashtaka, Basava panchaka, Ashtottara satanama gadya, Panchaprakara gadya and Asharanka gadya.

Works in translation
 Siva's Warriors: The Basava Purana of Palkuriki Somanatha, Tr. by Velcheru Narayana Rao.  Princeton Univ Press, 1990. .

Notes

References

See also
Web page on Palkuriki Somanatha

Telugu poets
Kannada poets
Sanskrit poets
Lingayatism
History of Karnataka
History of Telangana
Sanskrit literature
Indian Shaivites
Year of death unknown
People from Warangal
Year of birth unknown
12th-century Indian poets
13th-century Indian poets
Lingayat saints
https://en.wikipedia.org/wiki/Madivala_Machideva
Lingayat poets